Death Trance is a 2005 Japanese action/fantasy film based on the manga of the same name by Kana Takeuchi. It stars Tak Sakaguchi of Versus fame, alongside Kentaro Seagal (son of actor Steven Seagal) and Takamasa Suga. The film is the directorial debut of Yuji Shimomura, best known for his work as an action director, stuntman, and frequent collaborator of Ryuhei Kitamura. The film's soundtrack features several tracks by the rock band Dir en grey.

Plot
In an unknown place at an unknown time, a swordsman named Grave (Sakaguchi) yearns for the ultimate battle. Legend tells of a black coffin kept at the Tougan Temple which has the power to grant any man's deepest desire. Hoping to utilize the coffin's ability to fulfill his wish, Grave infiltrates the temple and steals it. Accompanied by a mysterious young girl (Asada), Grave travels across the land towards a desert oasis, a place the tales indicate as being linked to the coffin's power.

Contrary to the popular legend, the Tougan monks believe that the coffin holds the Goddess of Destruction, who was banished from Heaven for trying to destroy the world, and whose release will bring about the apocalypse. Fearing the implications of Grave's actions, the monks dispatch Ryuen (Suga) to retrieve the coffin and prevent it from being opened. But many other forces are also searching for Grave and his prize, including treasure hunter Sid (Seagal), and an all-out free-for-all ensues as they all struggle to discover the secret power of the coffin.

Cast

 Tak Sakaguchi - Grave
 Takamasa Suga - Ryuen
 Kentaro Seagal - Sid
 Yuhki Takeuchi - Yuri
 Ben Hiura - Archbishop
 Honoka Asada - Girl
 Yoko Fujita - Goddess of destruction
 Osamu Takahashi - Master
 Chuck Johnson - Muscleman
 Kei Hasegawa - Capoeira User
 Masumi Shirai - Sword-wielding sister (left)
 Mie Nakao - Sword-wielding sister (right)
 Masaki Inatome - Ninja A / Flying Vampire 01
 Hitoshi Fukushima - Ninja B
 Naohiro Kawamoto - Flying Vampire 02
 Hiroko Yashiki - Fallen Angel
 Kentaro Shimazu - Mountain Bandit A
 Shuhei - Bandit Rene
 Shuya Yoshimoto - Bandit Leo
 Masaki Suzumura - Bandit Gogh
 Bob Suzuki - Bandit Joha
 Daijiro Tsuruoka - Bandit Dali

References

External links

Nippon Cinema Review

2000s Japanese-language films
Japanese martial arts films
2005 martial arts films
2005 action thriller films
2005 films
Japanese action thriller films
Tokyo Shock
2005 directorial debut films
2000s Japanese films